James Stewart  is a London-based family lawyer and Chambers HNW Family Lawyer of the Year.

The son of a County Tyrone farmer, Stewart was educated at Coleraine Academical Institution in County Londonderry, and the University of Essex. He attended the College of Law, Chester.

Legal career
Stewart qualified as a solicitor in 1990, was accredited by Resolution as a specialist family lawyer in 1999. A year later he was appointed partner and head of the family department at Reynolds Porter Chamberlain. In 2003 he was profiled in the "On the Verge" series of the Observer magazine . He became a partner at Manches, now Penningtons Manches LLP, in 2006, shortly after being elected as a Fellow of the International Academy of Family Lawyers (IAFL).

He is ranked as a leading individual in the 2015 edition of Legal 500, Spears WMS Legal Index and in Chambers UK 2011.

In January 2009 Stewart was appointed Governor of the IAFL and invited to become a member of the Times Law Panel, an advisory body of 100 of the country's most prominent barristers and solicitors. In January 2011 Stewart was named in the Lawyer Magazines 'Hot 100' listing.

Notable cases
Stewart has acted on a number celebrity and high-profile divorces. His clients have included Pricilla Waters (in her divorce against Roger Waters) and Julie Le Brocquy, producer of BAFTA award-winning Osama. Stewart also successfully represented Glory Annen Clibbery in the landmark family/Human Rights Act 1998 case of Clibbery v Allan (2002), where he won at first instance and on appeal. He also acted for the successful claimant, Kerry Cox, in the widely publicised cohabitation case of Cox v Jones in 2004. His firm, Penningtons Manches, represented Guy Ritchie in his divorce with his wife Madonna.

Publications
In 2015 Stewart's book, Family Law: Jurisdiction Comparisons, was published by Sweet and Maxwell.

Personal life
Stewart lives in Covent Garden, London.

See also
 Collaborative Family Law

References

External links
IAML Profile
Legal 500 Profile

Living people
People from Strabane
People educated at Coleraine Academical Institution
Alumni of the University of Essex
Solicitors from Northern Ireland
British solicitors
Lawyers from London
20th-century British lawyers
21st-century British lawyers
Litigators
British civil rights activists
Minority rights activists
British legal writers
Year of birth missing (living people)